The Cattleya Sho is a flat horse race in Japan open to two-year-old horses. It is run at Tokyo Racecourse over a distance of 1600 metres.

The race was first run in 2003 and then discontinued between 2008 and 2014. The race was reintroduced in 2015. In 2016, the race began to be included as part of the Road to the Kentucky Derby series.

The inaugural race in 2003 was run at 1800 metres. It has since run at 1600 metres.

Winners

See also 
Horse racing in Japan

References 

Horse races in Japan
Flat horse races for two-year-olds
Recurring sporting events established in 2003